Babar Nawaz Khan born 24 August 1986) is a Pakistani politician who had been a member of the National Assembly of Pakistan, from November 2015 to May 2018. Babar Nawaz Khan was born to a Hindko Speaking Utmanzai Pathan family of Hazara in Haripur, Pakistan, in 1986. He is the Son of A Great Leader "Shaheed e Awam" Akhtar Nawaz Khan. His family belongs to the semi-tribal area of Khyberpakhtunkhwa called Utman Upper Keya Khabal Area now in Haripur.

Early life and education 
He was born in Haripur in 1986. He was educated at the Jinnah Jame High School & College and received FSC (Pre Engineering Degree) from Board of Intermediate Abbottabad.

Political career

He ran for the seat of the Khyber Pakhtunkhwa Assembly as an independent candidate from Constituency PK-50 (Haripur-II) in by-polls held in January 2014, but was unsuccessful. He received 24,000 votes and lost the seat to Akbar Ayub Khan.

Khan was elected to the National Assembly of Pakistan as a candidate of Pakistan Muslim League (N) from Constituency NA-19 (Haripur) in a by-elections held in August 2015. He received 137,700 votes and defeated a candidate of Pakistan Tehreek-e-Insaf. During his tenure as Member of the National Assembly, he served as chairman of Standing Committee of the National Assembly on Human Rights. Babar Nawaz Khan enjoyed the support of 50% of the youth vote from Haripur. Singer Rafaqat Ali awan also made a song for Babar Nawaz Khan to support him in General Election 2018.

In 2018 Pakistani general election, Omar Ayub Khan defeated PML-N's candidate Babar Nawaz Khan to re-elected to the National Assembly from Constituency NA-17 (Haripur) as a candidate of PTI.

Babar Nawaz Khan's greatest achievement in his tenure from 2015 to 2018 is supply of Sui Gas to more than 600 villages of Haripur. Khan was Youngest Parliamentarian during former government tenure.

References

Living people
Pakistan Muslim League (N) politicians
Pashtun people
Pakistani MNAs 2013–2018
1986 births